This is a list of people associated with Trinity Western University in Vancouver, British Columbia.

 Carolyn Arends, musician, songwriter, and author
 Jonathan Auxier, children's author
 Paul Chamberlain, professor of philosophy at Trinity Western
 Roger Cross, television and screen actor
 Deborah Grey, former Member of Parliament, former acting Leader of the Official Opposition (Canada)
 Bernie Herms, musician, producer, and composer (husband of Natalie Grant)
 Paul Janz, philosophy professor, former international musician
 Brie King, professional volleyball player and musician.
Damien C. Kurek, Member of Parliament, Battle River-Crowfoot
Dane Lloyd, Infantry Officer, Member of Parliament, Sturgeon River-Parkland
 Grant McNally, former Member of Parliament
 Chaim Schalk, Olympic and professional beach volleyball player
 Chuck Strahl, former Member of Parliament, Minister of Indian and Northern Affairs Canada
 Mark Strahl, Member of Parliament
 Tara Teng, abolitionist and beauty pageant winner
 Ryan Walter, former NHL player, former assistant coach of the Vancouver Canucks; now motivational speaker, author and leadership expert
 Mark Warawa, Member of Parliament, former Parliamentary Secretary
 Phillip H. Wiebe, professor of philosophy and religious studies at Trinity Western
Bob Zimmer, Member of Parliament, Prince George-Peace River-Northern Rockies



people
Trinity Western University
Trinity Western University